Stoelting is a company founded in 1886, based in Illinois, United States, in the field of psychological assessments, physiological assessment, and psychophysiological measurement.

History 
Christian Hans Stoelting created Stoelting (originally called Chicago Laboratory Supply and Scale Co.) in 1886 and quickly grew it into a successful supplier and producer of physiological and psychological products.

From 1903 to 1943, Stoelting was the principal producer of psychological assessments and therapeutic products of the material culture of American psychology, with products that were supplied globally.

At the St. Louis Universal Exposition of 1904, C.H. Stoelting Co. was awarded Medals for Anthropometric Apparatus and Psychometric Apparatus.

A number of Stoelting products from that early time period are available to see in museums and in displays globally.

Stoelting continues to produce products in psychology, with an inventory of many notable assessments, including the Leiter-3, Merrill-Palmer-Revised, and Stroop, Color & Word Test, among others.  In addition, Stoelting has a number of products in physiological assessment, including products for assessment of laboratory animals, dynamometers, and instruments for precise measurement.

References

External links

Psychological testing
History of psychology
Companies established in 1886
Companies based in DuPage County, Illinois